Dionisi is an Italian surname. Notable people with the surname include:

Alessio Dionisi (born 1980), Italian footballer and football manager
Armando Dionisi (born 1949), Italian politician
Federico Dionisi (born 1987), Italian footballer
Renato Dionisi (born 1947), Italian pole vaulter
Renato Dionisi (composer) (1910–2000), Italian composer and music educator
Stefano Dionisi (born 1966), Italian actor

See also
Dionysis

Italian-language surnames